Kunminia is a genus of cynodont synapsids from the Early Jurassic (Sinemurian) Lufeng Formation of China.

References 

Prehistoric cynodont genera
Sinemurian genera
Early Jurassic synapsids
Jurassic synapsids of Asia
Jurassic China
Fossils of China
Fossil taxa described in 1947
Taxa named by Yang Zhongjian